Li Tibei (born June 12, 1939 – ) is a Chinese astrophysicist, who is a member of the Chinese Academy of Sciences. He was elected to the academy in 1997.

References 

1939 births
Members of the Chinese Academy of Sciences
Living people